Events in the year 2023 in Slovakia.

Incumbents 
 President: Zuzana Čaputová
 Prime Minister: Eduard Heger

Events 
Ongoing  COVID-19 pandemic in Slovakia
January 21: 2023 Slovakian constitutional referendum: Slovakians head to the polls to vote in a referendum to determine whether early elections can be called before the customary end of the mandate.
February 23: Four people are killed after a plane crashes near Trenčianske Stankovce, Trenčín Region.

Deaths 

 7 January: Miroslav Celler, 31, squash player.
 23 January: Jozef Dravecký, 75, diplomat.
 1 February: Jozef Čapla, 84, ice hockey player (HC Slovan Bratislava, HC Dukla Jihlava, Augsburger EV).
 13 February Milan Hamada, 89, Slovak literary critic.
 21 February Eva Siracká, 96, Slovak physician, president of the League Against Cancer

References 

 
Slovakia
Slovakia
2020s in Slovakia
Years of the 21st century in Slovakia